Franchise Group, Inc., is an American publicly traded holding company that acquires and manages mainly franchise companies. It owns brands in various retail industries including American Freight, Buddy's Home Furnishings, The Vitamin Shoppe, Pet Supplies Plus, Sylvan Learning and Badcock Home Furniture.

History

The Franchise Group was founded in 2019 through the merger of Liberty Tax and Buddy's Home Furnishings. It originally operated under the name Liberty Tax but changed its name to the Franchise Group, leaving Liberty Tax and Buddy's Home Furnishings as subsidiaries. 

It began expanding in 2019 with the acquisition of The Vitamin Shoppe and Sears Outlet. The Franchise Group purchased American Freight for $450 million in cash in 2020. After the acquisition, the company merged Sears Outlet into American Freight.

On November 5, 2020, Franchise Group announced that it would acquire Fort Smith, Arkansas-based regional furniture retailer FFO Home, which filed for Chapter 11 bankruptcy protection on the same day. The acquisition was completed on December 29.

In 2021, the Franchise Group sold Liberty Tax to NextPoint Financial for $249 million. The same year, it purchased Pet Supplies Plus in a deal valued at $700 million, Sylvan Learning for $81 million, and Badcock Home Furniture for $580 million.

Subsidiaries

Current subsidiaries
 American Freight; a chain of discount furniture and home furnishing stores that was acquired in February 2020
 Buddy's Home Furnishings; offers home furniture including sofas, chairs, dining tables, as well as electronics, and appliances. Buddy's Home Furnishings serves clients in the United States.
The Vitamin Shoppe; offers nutritional supplements in every 785 stores across the U.S., as well as online. Acquired by Franchise Group in December 2019 after Irving Place Capital sold the remaining shares of the company and its division, Super Supplements to Franchise Group in the same year.
 Pet Supplies Plus; offers pet supplies and services in 400-plus locations in 30-plus US states.'''  
 Sylvan Learning; supplemental learning centers which provide personalized instruction in reading, writing, mathematics, study skills, homework support, and test preparation for college entrance and state exams.
 Badcock Home Furniture; furniture store chain with over 370 company and dealer owned furniture stores in eight states across the southeastern United States.

Former subsidiaries
 Sears Outlet Stores; outlet version of Sears department stores located in various retail locations across the U.S., as well as online. Sold to Franchise Group in October 2019 while Transform Holdco completed the acquisition of the remainder of Sears Hometown at the end of the same business day. In April 2020, Sears Oulet was merged into American Freight and the stores were rebranded American Freight.
 Liberty Tax; facilitates refund-based tax settlement financial products, including tax preparation, refund anticipation loans, electronic refund checks, and personal income tax refund discounting. Liberty Tax Service conducts its business in the United States.

References

External links 
 

Holding companies of the United States
American companies established in 2019
Franchises
Companies listed on the Nasdaq